Ladies Legend Pro-Wrestling, also known as LLPW and currently as LLPW-X, is a Japanese independent women's professional wrestling promotion founded in 1992 by Rumi Kazama and Shinobu Kandori.

History 
Japan Women's Pro-Wrestling split in 1992 into two promotions, JWP and LLPW. Kandori formed LLPW and was both a co-owner and one of their top stars. The group contained former Japan Women's Pro wrestlers and recruited the formerly retired All Japan Women's wrestler, Noriyo Tateno. Their debut show was on August 29, 1992. The promotion co-promoted with All Japan Women's in the 1990s, with many All Japan Women vs LLPW matchups. In 1995, LLPW held a female Mixed martial arts tournament called, "LLPW
Ultimate L-1 Tournament", which was one of the first female MMA shows. In 2002, the group changed its name to LLPW-X.

As of 2010, the group is no longer running regularly, but has at least ran one event per year.

Championships

Roster
 Mizuki Endo / Eiger
 Sayuri Okino (Inactive)
 Shinobu Kandori
 Takako Inoue

Former talent

References

External links

 

Japanese women's professional wrestling promotions
Entertainment companies established in 1992
1992 establishments in Japan
Mixed martial arts organizations